Guydaraq Kandi (also Romanized as Guydaraq Kandī; also known as Gūreh Daraq, Guydaraq, Gūy Daraq-e Tāzeh Kand, Karadara, Kūydaraq, Taza-kend, Taza-Kend, and Tāzeh Kand) is a village in Bedevostan-e Gharbi Rural District, Khvajeh District, Heris County, East Azerbaijan Province, Iran. At the 2006 census, its population was 154, in 35 families.

References 

Populated places in Heris County